Luckett or Lucketts may refer to:

People
LeToya Luckett (born 1981), American musician and actress
Johnny Luckett, an American actor; see The Second Civil War 
Phil Luckett, official in the National Football League
Jammes Luckett, American musician
Oliver Luckett (born 1974), American entrepreneur
Pete Luckett (born 1953), British-Canadian entrepreneur and media personality
Philip N. Luckett(c. 1823–1869), American soldier and physician
H.P. Luckett (1847–1925), American physician
Bill Luckett (1903–1985), English professional footballer
Lt. Col. William Thomas Luckett, Jr (1928-2000), US Air Force Officer and Vietnam Veteran

Places
Lucketts, Virginia, United States
Lucketts School
Luckett, Cornwall, United Kingdom

See also
 Luckett & Farley, an American architectural firm